Phyllostachys
is a genus of Asian bamboo in the grass family.  Many of the species are found in central and southern China, with a few species in northern Indochina and in the Himalayas. Some of the species have become naturalized in parts of Asia, Australia, the Americas, and southern Europe.

The stem or culm has a prominent groove, called a sulcus, that runs along the length of each segment (or internode).  Because of this, it is one of the most easily identifiable genera of bamboo. Most of the species spread aggressively by underground rhizomes. Being pioneer plants, phyllostachys species will not spread quickly or achieve mature height without access to direct sunlight throughout most of the day.

Some species of Phyllostachys grow to 100 ft (30 m) tall in optimum conditions.  Some of the larger species, sometimes known as "timber bamboo", are used as construction timber and for making furniture. Several species are cultivated as ornamental plants, though they can become invasive and troublesome in gardens, unless artificially restricted or grown in containers.

The name Phyllostachys means "leaf spike" and refers to the inflorescences.

Taxonomy
Species

Formerly included
species now considered better suited to other genera: Bambusa Chimonobambusa Pseudosasa Semiarundinaria Shibataea

Ecology
Fungi and pathogens growing specifically on Phyllostachys have phyllostachydis or phyllostachydicola species epithets.

Regulations
Connecticut property owners are liable for the cost of removing Phyllostachys bamboo that grows onto neighboring property, any resulting damages, and fines of $100 per day for growing this bamboo within 40 ft of any adjoining property or public way.

New York has regulations listing P. aurea and P. aureosulcata as prohibited invasive species.

References

 Zheng-ping Wang & Chris Stapleton Flora of China, Volume 22: Poaceae., Science Press u. a., Beijing u. a. 20

External links

 
 http://delta-intkey.com/grass/www/phyllost.htm

 
Bambusoideae genera
Grasses of Asia
Garden plants of Asia
Taxa named by Joseph Gerhard Zuccarini